Zorana Todorović (born December 30, 1989) is a Serbian women's basketball player.

Todorović in one interview made clear her fondness of her height and expressed her wish to grow taller than Poland's Margo Dydek and thus become the world's tallest female basketball player. She is one of the tallest women in Europe. Todorovic takes a size 50 European shoe (UK size 15).

References

1989 births
Living people
People from Vršac
Serbian women's basketball players
Serbian expatriate basketball people in Bosnia and Herzegovina
Centers (basketball)
ŽKK Vojvodina players